The Co-Respondent is a 1917 American silent drama film directed by Ralph Ince and starring Elaine Hammerstein, Wilfred Lucas and George Anderson. It was based on a Broadway play, and was adapted again by Universal Pictures as The Whispered Name in 1924.

Cast
 Elaine Hammerstein as Ann Gray
 Wilfred Lucas as Richard Manning
 George Anderson as Howard Van Keel
 Winifred Harris as Friend of Mrs. van kreel
 Richard Neill as Attorney for Mrs. van Keel
 Charles Smith as Bellhop
 Josephine Morse as Aunt
 Hattie Horne as Gossip
 Robert Cain as Gossip
 Edna Hunter as Gossip

References

Bibliography
 Robert B. Connelly. The Silents: Silent Feature Films, 1910-36, Volume 40, Issue 2. December Press, 1998.

External links
 

1917 films
1917 drama films
1910s English-language films
American silent feature films
Silent American drama films
American black-and-white films
Universal Pictures films
Films directed by Ralph Ince
American films based on plays
1910s American films